Woodend is a small village in West Northamptonshire in the English county of Northamptonshire.

The village's name means 'at the end of the wood'.

After World War I it was designated a "thankful village", all of the soldiers it sent to war having returned safely. The population of the village at the 2011 Census was 322.

There is a Barrow about 250 yards east of Green's Park Farm.

References

External links

Villages in Northamptonshire
Civil parishes in Northamptonshire
West Northamptonshire District